Pseudocotalpa giulianii, also known as Giuliani's dune scarab and Giuliani's dune scarab beetle,  is a species of sand dune-inhabiting beetle in the family Scarabaeidae. It is endemic to Nevada, the United States. It is named for Derham Giuliani who first collected this species from the Amargosa Desert.

Pseudocotalpa giulianii males measure  and females  in length.

References

Rutelinae
Beetles of the United States
Endemic fauna of Nevada
Beetles described in 1974
Taxonomy articles created by Polbot